Sheena Tosta (née Johnson; born October 1, 1982) is an American track and field athlete who competes in the 400 metres hurdles. Her personal best time is 52.95 seconds, achieved in July 2004 in Sacramento. She won a silver medal in the Women's 400 metre hurdles at the 2008 Olympic Games.

She finished fourth at the 2004 Summer Olympics and eighth at the 2006 World Athletics Final. She represented her country at the World Championships in Athletics in 2007 and 2009.

Born in Camden, New Jersey, she graduated from Gar-Field Senior High School in Woodbridge, VA in 2000. She was a member of the Mount Zion Baptist Church in Triangle, VA.

References

External links
 
 
 
 
 
 

1982 births
Living people
Sportspeople from Camden, New Jersey
Track and field athletes from Virginia
American female hurdlers
African-American female track and field athletes
Olympic silver medalists for the United States in track and field
Athletes (track and field) at the 2004 Summer Olympics
Athletes (track and field) at the 2008 Summer Olympics
Medalists at the 2008 Summer Olympics
Pan American Games track and field athletes for the United States
Pan American Games gold medalists for the United States
Pan American Games medalists in athletics (track and field)
Athletes (track and field) at the 2007 Pan American Games
Medalists at the 2007 Pan American Games
World Athletics Championships athletes for the United States
UCLA Bruins women's track and field athletes
21st-century African-American sportspeople
21st-century African-American women
20th-century African-American people
20th-century African-American women